Marble City or The Marble City may refer to:

United States
 Marble City, Oklahoma, a town
 Marble City Community, Oklahoma, a census-designated place
 Marble Falls, Arkansas, an unincorporated community, originally known as Marble City
 Sylacauga, Alabama, sometimes known as "The Marble City"
 Marble City Media, owner of Alabama radio stations WSGN (FM) and WFXO (AM)

Elsewhere
 Igbeti, Oyo State, Nigeria, a town, sometimes known as "The Marble City" 
 Kilkenny, Ireland, a city, sometimes known as "The Marble City"